Juan Luis Buñuel (9 November 1934, Paris – 6 December 2017, Paris) was a film and television director, screenwriter, and actor.  His films include Expulsion of the Devil (Au rendez-vous de la mort joyeuse, 1973) and La Femme aux bottes rouges (1974).

History 
Buñuel was the son of the filmmaker Luis Buñuel.  Buñuel's son Diego also became a filmmaker.

After his career in film, he tried out sculpting.

Filmography

As director
 Calanda (1966)
 Au rendez-vous de la mort joyeuse (Expulsion of the Devil, 1973)
 La Femme aux bottes rouges (1974)
 Léonor (Mistress of the Devil, 1975)
  (1980, TV miniseries)
 El Jugador de ajedrez (1981)
 La Rebelión de los colgados (1985)
 Guanajuato, una leyenda (1990)

References

External links 
 

1934 births
2017 deaths
French television directors
French screenwriters
French people of Spanish descent
Film directors from Paris
Horror film directors